Purvis is a surname and occasionally a given name.

Purvis may also refer to:

Places
 Purvis, Mississippi, a city
 Purvis High School
 Purvis, Missouri, an unincorporated community
 Purvis Bay, Florida Islands (part of the Solomon Islands)
 Purvis Glacier, Antarctica
 Purvis Peak, Victoria Land, Antarctica
 Cape Purvis, Dundee Island, Antarctica
 Point Purvis, South Georgia Island

Plays
 Purvis, by Denis Johnson

See also
 Purvis bank, a technique used in regenerative agriculture to help prevent soil erosion
 Purvis Eureka, an Australian sports car
 Purves (disambiguation)